The Bulleteers (1942) is the fifth of seventeen animated Technicolor short films based upon the DC Comics character of Superman, originally created by Jerry Siegel and Joe Shuster. This animated short was created by Fleischer Studios. The story runs about nine minutes and covers Superman's adventures as he defends the city against a villainous gang called "The Bulleteers", who are equipped with a bullet-shaped rocket car. It was originally released on March 27, 1942.

Plot
The story begins as the clock strikes midnight. A strange, bullet-shaped rocket-car blows right through the police department, leaving an explosion in its wake. The paper the next day reports the destruction of the building and bafflement of the police.  Perry White calls Lois Lane and Clark Kent into his office. Just as he is explaining the report, the sound of a loudspeaker comes in through the window. The leader of the "Bulleteers", as Lois later calls them, is shown announcing from his hideout atop a mountain outside of town, the demands of his gang. Over the speaker, Clark, Lois, Perry, and the rest of the town hear it: "Turn over the city treasury or other municipal buildings will be next as their last warning!"

Later that day, Lois asks the mayor what he is doing about the problem. The mayor announces that he will not be swayed by criminals. At the same time, policemen all over town setup sandbag fortifications for their machine guns and searchlights in preparation for the Bulleteers. At midnight, the gang strikes again, first destroying the town's power plant, bullets from defending policeman bouncing harmlessly off the bullet-car's sleek surface. Lights in the Daily Planet flicker on and off, and Lois takes off in a car to get closer to the scene, leaving Clark behind. Clark takes the opportunity to enter a nearby phone booth and don his Superman costume.

The Bulleteers take aim now at the city's treasury building, but Superman steps in front of them and knocks the rocket-car off course. As they struggle to regain control, he leaps in the air and grabs its front trying again to force it off-course, but the Bulleteers, through wild maneuvering, manage to shake him off the car to the ground below. Superman lunges to keep them from the treasury, only to arrive too late. Piles of rubble from the explosion bury him.

Lois Lane arrives at the scene in time to see the gang throwing bags of money into their car. She sneaks into its cockpit and tries to smash the controls with a wrench, but the gang returns, taking off with her. Superman, meanwhile, emerges from the rubble and chases after the car, grasping it by one of its retractable wings, and then by its tail-fins to throw it off course. As it spirals downward, he claws his way to the cockpit, rips it open, and pulls Lois and the three gangsters out. The car crashes to the ground far below.

The newspaper next day reports Superman's heroic feat and the gangsters' arrest for their rampage. Reading it, Clark remarks, "Nice going, Lois. Another great scoop for you".  Lois replies, "It was easy, thanks to Superman".

Cast
 Bud Collyer as Clark Kent / Superman, Bulleteer, Police Officer, Printer
 Joan Alexander as Lois Lane
 Julian Noa as Perry White, Mayor
 Jackson Beck as the Narrator

Appearances
 In Superman: Doomsday, the restored bullet car appears as one of Superman's trophies in his Fortress of Solitude.
 The line "We won't be intimidated by criminal threats" has been used in various promos for the action cartoon block Toonami.

References

External links

 
 
 The Bulleteers at the Internet Archive
 The Bulleteers at the Internet Movie Database

1942 short films
1942 animated films
1940s American animated films
1940s animated short films
1940s animated superhero films
Superman animated shorts
Fleischer Studios short films
Short films directed by Dave Fleischer
Flying cars in fiction
Paramount Pictures short films
Rotoscoped films
1940s English-language films
American animated short films